Itter is an urban quarter of Düsseldorf, part of Borough 9. It is located near to the river Rhine, adjacent to Himmelgeist, Holthausen and Reisholz. Its name comes from the small river called the Itter.

History

The first written record of Itter was in the 12th century AD
The romanesque church of Itter dates the 12th century.
From the 12th to 15th centuries Itter belonged to the convent of Kaiserswerth.
From the 15th century Itter was an autonomous parish.

Sights

The romanesque church of Itter was constructed in the 12th century. It is still standing but was enlarged in 1865.

Infrastructure

There are 4 bus lines in Itter, but no tram lines. One motorway - a federal road - goes through  Itter.

References

Urban districts and boroughs of Düsseldorf